Robert Michael (13 June 1879 – 20 March 1963) was an Australian rules footballer who played with Collingwood in the Victorian Football League (VFL). He is the great grandfather of triple premiership player Mal Michael.	

Recruited from Sale, he did not perform well in his debut VFL game and returned to Gippsland without playing another match.

Notes

External links 

		
Robert Michael's profile at Collingwood Forever

1879 births
1963 deaths
Australian rules footballers from Victoria (Australia)
Collingwood Football Club players
Sale Football Club players